The Breslau Tumbler is a breed of domestic pigeon. Breslau Tumblers, along with other varieties of domesticated pigeons, are all descendants from the rock pigeon (Columba livia).

Origin 
The Breslau Tumbler was created in Breslau (now Wroclaw, Poland) and is descended from the Prague (Czech) Tumbler.

See also 
List of pigeon breeds

References

Pigeon breeds
Pigeon breeds originating in Poland
Pigeon breeds originating in Germany
Pigeon breeds originating in Prussia